The 2016 Copa del Rey de Baloncesto was the 80th edition of the Spanish King's Basketball Cup. It was managed by the ACB and was held in A Coruña, in the Coliseum on February 18–21, 2016. Real Madrid won their 26th cup.

Qualified teams
The seven first qualified after the first half of the 2015–16 ACB regular season qualified to the tournament. As Rio Natura Monbus Obradoiro, host team, not finished between the seven first teams, the eighth qualified did not enter in the Copa del Rey.

Draw
The draw of the 2016 Copa del Rey de Baloncesto was on 25 January 2016 at approximately 12:00 local time (CET) and was live on YouTube and broadcast live on TV in many countries. The seeded teams were paired in the quarterfinals with the non-seeded teams. There are not any restrictions for the draw of the semifinals. As in recent seasons, the first qualified team play its quarterfinal game on Thursday.

Bracket

Quarterfinals

FC Barcelona Lassa vs. Dominion Bilbao Basket

Valencia Basket vs. Herbalife Gran Canaria

Real Madrid vs. Montakit Fuenlabrada

Rio Natura Monbus Obradoiro vs. Laboral Kutxa Baskonia

Semifinals

Dominion Bilbao Basket vs. Herbalife Gran Canaria

Laboral Kutxa Baskonia vs. Real Madrid

Final

References and notes

External links
Copa del Rey official website
Copa del Rey news

Copa del Rey de Baloncesto
2015–16 in Spanish basketball cups